KIS International School is a co-educational full International Baccalaureate world school in Bangkok, Thailand, serving students ages 3 to 19. This top international school in Bangkok is one of the few international schools to offer all four IB programmes: the PYP, the MYP, IB Diploma and the CP (Career-Related). The IB results are strong and consistent and students are accepted at top universities around the world. KIS is medium-sized, with an outstanding academic programme, excellent and modern facilities and a warm and caring community. Students are respected and recognised as individuals, and new students are welcomed.

The school is located near the city center and has a free shuttle bus from the MRT (Thai Cultural Center), as well as school buses that pick up and drop off students around the city. Scholarships are available.

KIS is located close to the city center in Huai Khwang District, Bangkok, Thailand.

Academics and curriculum 
The Primary Years Programme (aged 3 – 11)
The Middle Years Programme (aged 11 – 16)
The IB Diploma Programme (aged 16 – 18)
The IB CP Program (age 16-18)

Professional accreditation and affiliation 
IB World School – Authorized by International Baccalaureate (IB)
Accredited by The Council of International Schools (CIS)
Licensed by Kingdom of Thailand Ministry of Education
Member of The International Schools Association of Thailand (ISAT)
Member of Thailand International School Activities Conference (TISAC)
Member of EARCOS (The East Asia Regional Council of Schools)
 Member of Mekong River International Schools Association (MRISA)

History 
KIS was opened in 1998 as Kesinee International School Bangkok, offering Kindergarten and Primary education, with the IB Primary Years Programme.

In 2003, the school rebranded from Kesinee International school to KIS International School Bangkok, and embarked on its secondary school expansion plan, introducing the IB Middle Years Programme, along with a new secondary school facility built to suit the requirements of both the MYP and the IB Diploma programme.

KIS has now grown into a highly ranked IB school whose intentional medium size community offers each student more individual attention and a better learning experience. The co-educational school provides day school facilities to students aged 3 to 19.

The school is a respected member of EARCOS and is accredited by CIS and ONESQA. The school is affiliated to the International Baccalaureate board for over 21 years now and offers the International Baccalaureate (IB) Primary Years Programme, IB Middle Years Programme, IB Diploma Programme curriculum. KIS has been authorized to offer the IB Career-Related Programme in May 2022, making it the only school in the Bangkok area to offer all four IB programmes. KIS also prepares its students for both the IB and SAT examinations and has long been a test administrator of the SAT.

The sprawling campus located on more than 25 thousand square meters of green land offers a range of facilities such as sporting facilities, the music suites and dance studios, auditorium, air-conditioned indoor gymnasium, a 25-meter pool, lounge area, audibox mini auditorium, multipurpose hall, carpentry room, home sciences room and a modern arts and designs centre.

KIS has over 750 students ranging from 3 – 19 years of age with a student/teacher ratio of 8:1.

References

External links 
Official School Website
Bangkok Post: KIS International School launches new IB Programme
Bkk Kids: IB World Schools, The Facts vs. The Myths
IB World Schools Yearbook

International schools in Bangkok
International Baccalaureate schools in Thailand
Educational institutions established in 1998
1998 establishments in Thailand
Private schools in Thailand